David Hickson (30 October 1929 – 8 July 2013) was an English professional footballer who played for Everton, Aston Villa, Huddersfield Town, Liverpool, Cambridge City, Bury and Tranmere Rovers

Club career
Hickson started his football career as a teenager with non-league Ellesmere Port Town, where his robust style and keen eye for goal were noticed by the Everton manager Cliff Britton. He signed for the Toffees in 1948, but serving his stint of National Service delayed his debut for another three years. During this period he played for the Cheshire Army Cadets team, and it was with them that he was coached by the Everton legend Dixie Dean. It is fairly safe to assume that Dave developed the physical side of his game in this period. Hickson made his debut for Everton in September 1951 against Leeds United, with the Blues in Division Two for only the second season in their history. Hickson was soon a regular fixture in the Everton side.

Perhaps the defining moment in Dave's career came in Everton's 1952–53 FA Cup run. The Blues were still in Division Two, and home wins against Ipswich Town and Nottingham Forest put Everton into the fifth round, where they were drawn with Manchester United. In front of a capacity crowd at Goodison Park, Hickson launched himself headlong in amongst flying boots and emerged with a huge gash above one eyebrow. Hickson was led off down the tunnel, with the crowd fully expecting Everton to play the remainder with 10 men, as substitutes were not yet permitted. He emerged from the tunnel in the second half, greeted by a huge ovation from the crowd, with a row of freshly applied stitches holding the wound together. Minutes later Hickson scored what would end up as the winning goal, then headed against the post and opened the wound again. Despite pleas from both the referee and his captain to leave the field Hickson remained to the end of the game, his blond hair now red, and his shirt the same colour as the United ones. Hickson was also the match-winner in the quarter final against Aston Villa, with a thunderbolt shot from the edge of the box, after starting the move himself behind the halfway line. An epic year for cup ties this, as Everton next faced Bolton Wanderers at Maine Road. Hickson again received a head injury in this game, and was forced to retire with 15 minutes of the game to go. This was not until he'd scored a goal in an improbable comeback from 4-0 down at half time. The final score was 4–3, with Bolton going on to be defeated by the same score against Blackpool in the "Matthews final".

Everton soon returned to Division One, as Hickson's haul of 25 goals in the 1953–54 season helped them gain promotion to the top flight. After just one season back in the top flight with Everton, Hickson was sold to Aston Villa for £17,500. He never settled at Villa Park and played just 12 games in a brief stay.

He moved next to Huddersfield Town, where he spent a further two years. Although his record at Huddersfield was respectable, Hickson was not content and he was happy to return to Goodison for a second spell in 1957 for £7,500. At least the board made a tidy profit on these deals. Hickson's second spell was not as productive as his first, but his passion & determination remained, and the Goodison Park faithful still worshipped him. When Everton sold him to their Merseyside derby rivals Liverpool in 1959, there was much dissent.

Hickson was undoubtedly revered at Everton, but equally despised by the red half of the city. Supporters of the Reds, then struggling in Division Two, would soon be appeased. Hickson scored twice on his Liverpool debut at Anfield, watched by a crowd 15,000 higher than the average that season. Days later Liverpool had a new manager, Bill Shankly. Shankly had previously managed Hickson at Huddersfield and again made effective use of Hickson's style. His return of 21 goals in 27 games that season almost took Liverpool back to the top flight. Another near promotion the following year and a return of 16 goals in 33 would see the end of Hickson's stint with Liverpool. Hickson was now nearing 32 and had to make way for Shankly's new signings.

Hickson moved on, via non league Cambridge City, to Bury for a short spell, playing just a handful of games. He headed back to Merseyside in the twilight of his career, with a productive last couple of league seasons at Tranmere Rovers. He was Rovers' leading scorer in the 1962/63 season with 23 goals, at the age of 34. Dave continued after this outside the Football League, playing for Ellesmere Port Town and Ballymena United (player/manager for both), and as a player at Winsford, Northwich Victoria and Fleetwood F.C..

It is often said of Hickson that he is the only player to have played "for all three Merseyside clubs". This is wrong for several reasons: two other players, John Heydon and Frank Mitchell, also played for all three of Everton, Liverpool and Tranmere Rovers. But New Brighton were Football League members from 1923–51 and Bill Lacey and Neil McBain played for all three of Everton, Liverpool and New Brighton. In addition, John Whitehead played for Liverpool, Everton and also for Bootle in their one year as a league team (1892/93), before they were replaced in Division 2 by Liverpool.

Playing style
His physical approach as centre forward, coupled with his determination soon made him a crowd favourite. Off the pitch, Hickson was a different man, quiet and unassuming, but the Dave Hickson that pulled on a Blue shirt and entered battle every Saturday afternoon was an aggressive character, no quarter given or asked. This aggression would lead to several run-ins with officials, and three sendings-off during his career, but that was his style & the fans loved it. A youthful Hickson with his striking appearance, fully quiffed up with a shock of blonde hair, as was the style of the day, was one of the few things to get excited about on the terraces of Goodison Park. Dave Hickson soon forged a productive partnership with John Willie Parker, with Hickson being the target man. Although his reputation as an aerial threat was well known, Hickson was also a difficult opponent with the ball on the floor, and could produce a powerful shot, which earned him the nickname Cannonball Kid.

Death
On 8 July 2013, Hickson died after a short illness, at the age of 83. His funeral service was held on 25 July 2013 at Liverpool Cathedral.

References

External links
Everton FC Profile
Aston Villa player database profile
LFCHistory.net profile
Legends Feature from barmyarmyuk Blog

1929 births
2013 deaths
Military personnel from Lancashire
British military personnel
People from Ellesmere Port
English footballers
Association football forwards
Ellesmere Port Town F.C. players
Everton F.C. players
Aston Villa F.C. players
Huddersfield Town A.F.C. players
Liverpool F.C. players
Bury F.C. players
Tranmere Rovers F.C. players
English Football League players
Ballymena United F.C. managers
Ballymena United F.C. players
Cambridge City F.C. players
English football managers